Bobby Bold Eagle (born 1948) is a retired American professional wrestler, and trainer.

Bobby Bold Eagle may also refer to:
 Bob Boyer, Canadian professional wrestler
 Joe Gomez (wrestler) (born 1973), American professional wrestler